A bell pull is a woven textile, pull cord, handle, knob, or other object that connects with a bell or bell wire, and which rings a service bell when pulled. Bell pulls may be used to summon workers in homes of people who employ butlers, housemaids, nannies or other domestic workers, and often have a tassel at the bottom. The bell pull is one element of a complex interior mechanical network which, in Victorian times, typically involved a range of bell pulls in different rooms, connected to a central bank of labelled bells in a room where servants would wait to be summoned.

Central bell panel
In the 19th century, some hotels also had a panel with a bell for each room, as part of a centralized bell system.

Transport 

A bell pull is used in some forms of public transport, mostly buses, for passengers to signal to a driver to halt at a particular bus stop.

See also 
 Door bell
 Door knocker

References 

Ropework